Enrique Villaplana (7 March 1914 – 16 May 1983) was a Spanish racewalker. He competed in the men's 50 kilometres walk at the 1948 Summer Olympics.

References

External links
 

1914 births
1983 deaths
Athletes (track and field) at the 1948 Summer Olympics
Spanish male racewalkers
Olympic athletes of Spain
Place of birth missing